Othnielmarshia is an extinct genus of placental mammal from the Paleocene and the Eocene of South America, belonging to the family Henricosborniidae within the order Notoungulata. It was named after the famous paleontologist Othniel Charles Marsh.

Description

This genus is mainly known from its brachyodont and bunolophodont molars. The upper molars had generally a very scanty crochet, in many cases completely absent. Only the first and second upper molars consistently had an hypocone. Unlike Henricosbornia, Othnielmarshia had a sharp labial cingulum. The third molar did not have a metastyle, or it was weakly developed. For the lower molars, the hypoconulid is more difficult to differentiate and the entoconid is more conical and closer from the hypoconulid than in Henricosbornia.

References

Notoungulates
Paleocene mammals of South America
Eocene mammals of South America
Paleogene Argentina
Fossils of Argentina
Fossil taxa described in 1901
Taxa named by Florentino Ameghino
Prehistoric placental genera
Golfo San Jorge Basin
Sarmiento Formation